Félix Dolci (born 5 May 2002) is a Canadian male artistic gymnast.  He is the 2019 Junior World Champion on rings.  He has been a member of the Canadian national team since 2017.

Early life 
Dolci was born in Saint-Eustache, Québec in 2002. He started gymnastics at the age of 6 at Laval Excellence, a gym in Laval, Québec. His first competition was in 2009 and, up to this day, has won over 200 medals and awards, including sports merits and other honors. His mother suggested he try gymnastics, mainly as a way to release his energy, as sports such as hockey and soccer failed to adequately do that. Dolci speaks both French and English as he resides in the province of Québec. Dolci is coached by Adrian Balan.

Junior career

2018 
Dolci suffered a shoulder injury at the start of 2018 which made it difficult to do horizontal bar, pommel horse, and parallel bars. Because of this, he was not able to compete his best at the Élite Canada competition in February and ended up in fourth place in the all-around.  Dolci recovered and in April he competed at the Pacific Rim Championships in Medellin, Colombia.  He helped Canada place second as a team and individually he placed second on rings, fourth on parallel bars, and eighth on horizontal bar.  He next competed at the Canadian Championships held in Waterloo, Ontario and placed first on all-around, floor, vault, and horizontal bar; second on rings; third on parallel bars; and fourth on pommel horse. Dolci's second international competition of the year came in June at the Junior Pan American Gymnastics Championships in Buenos Aires, Argentina.  While there he helped Canada win bronze as a team.  Individually he won gold on rings and bronze in the all-around, on floor exercise, and on horizontal bar.

In October Dolci was back in Buenos Aires for the Youth Olympic Games.  He placed second on rings, sixth on floor exercise, seventh on vault, eighth on horizontal bar, and ninth in the all-around.  His silver made him the first Canadian gymnast to win a medal at the Youth Olympics (alongside Emma Spence who won a bronze medal on vault).  He rounded out the year with the Austrian Future Cup in Linz, Austria in November. He dominated the competition, placing first on every event (including team and all-around) minus the horizontal bar where he received the bronze medal.

2019 
Dolci started 2019 off in February with the Canada Games in Red Deer, Alberta. Competing in the junior competition, he won gold in all-around, high bar, vault, and floor; silver on rings and as part of the Québec team; and finished in 8th on pommel horse. This achievement made him the most decorated athlete in the Canada winter games history for a single year. Dolci then went to University of Calgary International Cup (UCIC) in Calgary, Alberta in March. He placed 1st on pommel horse, rings, and parallel bars, and got 6th on high bar.  In May, he went to the Canadian Championships in Ottawa, Ontario. There he received the gold medal in all events excluding vault and pommel horse where he placed 2nd and 4th, respectively.

At the end of June Dolci went to Győr, Hungary to compete at the inaugural Junior World Championships. Along with Ioannis Chronopoulos and Evgeny Siminiuc, Dolci helped Canada place fifth as a team with a combined total of 158.563.  Additionally he placed fourth in the all-around behind Shinnosuke Oka, Ryosuke Doi, and Illia Kovtun.  Dolci qualified for two event finals: floor exericse (in third) and rings (in second).  Dolci finished second in the floor exercise final with a 14.000, only 0.166 behind Ryu Sung-hyun of South Korea.  Later that day he competed in the rings final and earned a 13.600, winning the event by 0.1 ahead of silver medalist Diogo Soares of Brazil.  In both of the finals that Dolci was part of, he had the highest execution scores out of all of the 8 gymnasts part of the final.

Senior career

2020–2021 
In 2020 Dolci was about to start his senior career. However, during the COVID-19 pandemic, all gymnastics facilities where closed in Canada.  As a result he had to spend four months training at home.  Due to strict travel restrictions, Dolci was not allowed to compete in any international competition until the 2021 FIG Artistic Gymnastics World Cup series.  He competed at the World Cup in Koper, Slovenia, winning two bronze medals on vault and horizontal bar. Just a few days later, Dolci would win gold on floor exercise and silver on horizontal bar at the World Cup in Mersin, Turkey.  In October he competed at the 2021 World Championships in Kitakyushu.  He only competed on rings and horizontal bar; he did not qualify for any event finals.

2022
Dolci competed at the DTB Pokal Team Challenge and Mixed Cup in Stuttgart.  During the team challenge he helped Canada finish fifth as a team and individually he won gold on floor exercise, silver on horizontal bar behind Carlo Hörr, and bronze on rings and vault.  In July he was selected to compete at both the Pan American Championships and the Commonwealth Games.  At the Pan American Championships Dolci finished third in the all-around behind Caio Souza and Yul Moldauer.  Additionally he won silver on vault behind Souza and bronze on floor exercise behind Moldauer and Riley Loos. During the team final Dolci helped Canada finish third behind the USA and Brazil.

At the Commonwealth Games Dolci helped Canada place second behind England.  Individually he qualified to the all-around, floor exercise, rings, vault, and parallel bars finals.  He won silver on floor exercise behind Jake Jarman of England and placed fourth in the all-around, on vault, and on parallel bars and placed fifth on rings.  At the 2022 World Championships Dolci placed 35th in the all-around during qualifications and helped the Canadian team finish tenth.  He did not qualify for any individual finals.

Competitive history

References

External links

 
 
 

2002 births
Canadian male artistic gymnasts
Gymnasts at the 2018 Summer Youth Olympics
Living people
Medalists at the Junior World Artistic Gymnastics Championships
People from Saint-Eustache, Quebec
Sportspeople from Quebec
Youth Olympic silver medalists for Canada
Medalists at the 2018 Summer Youth Olympics
Gymnasts at the 2022 Commonwealth Games
Commonwealth Games silver medallists for Canada
Commonwealth Games medallists in gymnastics
21st-century Canadian people
Medallists at the 2022 Commonwealth Games